Ficidae, common name the fig shells are a family of medium to large marine gastropods. It is the only family in the superfamily Ficoidea.

According to taxonomy of the Gastropoda by Bouchet & Rocroi (2005) the family Ficidae has no subfamilies.

The shells of these snails are shaped rather like figs or pears, hence the common name.

The Ficidae were previously included in the Tonnaceae (now Tonnoidea) along with the Tonnidae and Cassididae.

Distribution
The family is found worldwide, mostly in tropical and subtropical silt and mud covered neritic zones.

Shell description
The shells of species in the Ficidae are thin but strong.  They have a large aperture and a long siphonal canal, but an extremely low spire which does not protrude above the outline of the body whorl.

Fig shells very often have subdued spiral ribbing, and are subtly patterned in shades of very pale brown and beige.

Genera 
Genera within the family Ficidae include:
 Ficus Röding, 1798
 † Austroficopsis Stilwell & Zinsmeister, 1992
 † Ficopsis Conrad, 1866
 † Fusoficula
 † Gonysycon
 Thalassocyon Barnard, 1960
Genera brought into synonymy
 Ficula Swainson, 1835 : synonym of Ficus Röding, 1798
 Pirula Montfort, 1810 : synonym of  Ficus Röding, 1798
 Pyrula Lamarck, 1799 : synonym of  Ficus Röding, 1798
 Sycotypus Gray, 1847 : synonym of  Ficus Röding, 1798

References

Further reading 
 Powell A. W. B., New Zealand Mollusca, William Collins Publishers Ltd, Auckland, New Zealand 1979 
 Miocene Gastropods and Biostratigraphy of the Kern River Area, California; United States Geological Survey Professional Paper 642